The Ambassador of Malaysia to the Kingdom of Bahrain is the head of Malaysia's diplomatic mission to Bahrain. The position has the rank and status of an Ambassador Extraordinary and Plenipotentiary and is based in the Embassy of Malaysia, Manama.

List of heads of mission

Ambassadors to Bahrain

See also
 Bahrain–Malaysia relations

References 

 
Bahrain
Malaysia